"The Eternal Kansas City" is a song by Northern Irish singer-songwriter Van Morrison. It was the key song on the 1977 album, A Period of Transition, and was his first single released since "Gloria", in 1974.

Biographer Howard DeWitt believes that the song makes the listener feel as if in a church, because of the "mystical choir", featured at the beginning of the song: "Excuse me do you know the way to Kansas City?". "Then an almost jump arrangement makes 'The Eternal Kansas City' an excellent rhythm and blues influenced song."

Johnny Rogan describes the song as "The only song on the album where there was evidence of Morrison's mysterious majesty, it blended the lily-white sound of Anita Kerr Singers with strong gospel overtones."

Dr John on the song
Dr John, arranger and musician on A Period of Transition, describes the song as being:
The song that Van got the whole album hooked up around. It was a real deep thing for him to focus on. It goes from a real ethereal voice sound to a jazz introduction and then into a kind of chunky R&B.

Personnel
 Van Morrison: vocal
 Ollie E. Brown: drums
 Marlo Henderson: guitar
 Jerry Jumonville: alto saxophone
 Reggie McBride: bass
 Joel Peskin: baritone saxophone
 Mac Rebennack (Dr. John): piano
 Mark Underwood: trumpet
 Carlena Williams, Paulette Parker, Candy Nash, Toni McVey: backing vocals

Notes

References
Hinton, Brian (1997). Celtic Crossroads: The Art of Van Morrison, Sanctuary,  
DeWitt, Howard A. (1983). Van Morrison: The Mystic's Music, Horizon Books,  
Rogan, Johnny (2006). Van Morrison: No Surrender, London:Vintage Books 

Van Morrison songs
1977 singles
Songs written by Van Morrison
1976 songs
Warner Records singles
Song recordings produced by Van Morrison